"When Can I See You" is the fifth single from the Babyface album For the Cool in You (1993). Released in 1994, the song became Babyface's highest-charting single on the Billboard Hot 100 chart, peaking at #4. The song also peaked at #6 on the U.S. R&B chart and at #35 on the UK Singles Chart. The song was also found on his greatest hits collection, released in 2000.

The song earned him his first performance Grammy Award for Best Male R&B Vocal Performance.

Charts

Weekly charts

Year-end charts

References

Babyface (musician) songs
1993 songs
1994 singles
Epic Records singles
Songs written by Babyface (musician)
Song recordings produced by Babyface (musician)
Song recordings produced by L.A. Reid
Song recordings produced by Daryl Simmons
Contemporary R&B ballads
American soft rock songs
Rock ballads